Renormalization group equation may refer to:

 Beta function
 Callan–Symanzik equation
 Exact renormalization group equation